Stilbopteryx is a genus of antlions belonging to the family Myrmeleontidae.

The species of this genus are found in Australia.

Species:

Stilbopteryx albosetosa 
Stilbopteryx auricornis 
Stilbopteryx costalis 
Stilbopteryx linearis 
Stilbopteryx mouldsorum 
Stilbopteryx napoleo 
Stilbopteryx walkeri

References

Myrmeleontidae
Myrmeleontidae genera